Big Stone Gap is a town in Wise County, Virginia, United States. The town was economically centered around the coal industry for much of its early development. The population was 5,254 at the 2020 census.

History
The community was formerly known as "Mineral City" and "Three Forks" before officially taking its name in 1888. The "Big Stone Gap" refers to the valley created on the Appalachia Straight, located between the town and Appalachia. The town served as an important center for coal and iron development in the 1880s and 1890s and residents hoped its coal and iron ore deposits would make it "the Pittsburgh of the South."

The Big Stone Gap post office was established in 1856. The Christ Episcopal Church, John Fox, Jr. House, Southwest Virginia Museum Historical State Park, Terrace Park Girl Scout Cabin, June Tolliver House, and C. Bascom Slemp Federal Building are listed on the National Register of Historic Places.

In October 1978, John W. Warner, then the Republican candidate for U.S. Senate from Virginia, and his wife, British-American actress Elizabeth Taylor, stopped in Big Stone Gap to campaign for his upcoming election. At Fraley's Coach House, a local diner where they were each meeting with voters, Taylor became choked on a chicken bone in her esophagus that required her to be transported to the nearby Lonesome Pine Regional Hospital. Taylor recovered from the event and later sent a donation to the hospital as a thank you.

In 2014 the American drama romantic comedy film Big Stone Gap, written and directed by Big Stone Gap native Adriana Trigiani and produced by Donna Gigliotti, began filming in the town. The film starred Ashley Judd, Patrick Wilson, Whoopi Goldberg, and others, including local talent for many of the extras and larger scenes. The movie was based on Trigiani's 2000 novel of the same name and was produced on a budget of $3.5 million. The film premiered at the Virginia Film Festival on November 6, 2014 and expanded to a wider release of over 100 theaters in 2015.

Big Stone Gap became the first locality in the nation to pass a resolution in support of the federal Black Lung Disability Trust Fund on August 16, 2018. The measure passed unanimously and urged Congress to support the existing tax rate at the time.

Public schools 
Due to mounting financial burdens caused by a shrinking population and underfunding from the state government, local elected officials voted to consolidate several of the county's schools in 2012, including those in Big Stone Gap.

Union Primary School was formed from the consolidation of Powell Valley Primary School and Appalachia Elementary. A combination of certain grades from Appalachia Elementary and Powell Valley Middle School formed Union Middle School. Finally, Union High School was formed from the consolidation of Appalachia High School and Powell Valley High School. All schools continue to be operated by Wise County Public Schools.

Colleges 
Mountain Empire Community College is a public community college for residents in Lee, Wise, Scott, and Dickenson counties, and the City of Norton. The college admitted its first students in 1972 and as of the 2017-18 school year enrolled 3,560 students.

King University, based in Bristol, Tennessee, has a satellite campus in Big Stone Gap located on the Mountain Empire Community College campus.

Museums

Big Stone Gap is home to several museums. The June Tolliver House, located on Jerome Street, is home to the Trail of the Lonesome Pine, the official outdoor drama of Virginia.  The Southwest Virginia Museum Historical State Park is located in the downtown area in the former home of C. Bascom Slemp. Construction of the building was completed in 1895 and purchased by Slemp in 1929. Before his death in 1943, Slemp established the C. Bascom Slemp Foundation and hoped to see the house turned into a museum. In 1946 the state of Virginia acquired the home, and the Slemp Foundation donated the initial collection from Slemp's personal belongings.

Big Stone Gap also hosts the Harry W. Meador, Jr. Coal Museum. Meador, to whom the museum is dedicated, collected many of the objects displayed in the museum from his time with the Westmoreland Coal Company during the first half of the 20th century. The museum was dedicated in 1982 after his death.

Federal court
The federal building named for C. Bascom Slemp was built in 1912 and it continues to house a division of the United States District Court for the Western District of Virginia.

Wallens Ridge State Prison
Big Stone Gap is home to Wallens Ridge State Prison, a state prison that has been a part of the Commonwealth of Virginia Department of Corrections since 1999. Originally opened as a supermax prison, it has recently been downgraded to a "high level" security facility. Construction and maintenance of the facility generated millions of dollars for the local economy, suppressed from a sagging history of coal mining.

Notable people
 Rufus A. Ayers - Former Virginia Attorney General
 Leanza Cornett - Miss America 1993
 John Fox, Jr. - Author
 Abner Linwood Holton Jr. - Former Virginia governor
 Julius Jones - Former Professional Football Player
 Thomas Jones - Former Professional Football Player
 Carl Martin - Musician
 Roy Cornelius Smith - Opera Singer
 CC Swiney - Film Actor
 Adriana Trigiani - Author
 Roy Hall, rockabilly pianist

Geography
Big Stone Gap is located at  (36.867165, −82.774471).

According to the United States Census Bureau, the town has a total area of 4.9 square miles (12.6 km2), all land.

Big Stone Gap is at the junction of U.S. Route 23 and U.S. Route 58 Alternate.

Big Stone Gap is closer to the state capitals of seven other states than it is to Richmond, VA, its own state capital, with regards to highway mileage.  The other state capitals are Columbus, OH; Frankfort, KY; Charleston, WV; Nashville, TN; Raleigh, NC; Columbia, SC; and Atlanta GA.  Additionally Indianapolis, Indiana is only six miles farther from Big Stone Gap than Richmond.

Climate
Big Stone Gap has a humid subtropical climate (Köppen climate classification Cfa).

Demographics

As of the census of 2010, there were 5,643 people, 2,034 households, and 1,075 families residing in the town. The population density was 995.9 people per square mile (384.2/km2). There were 2,197 housing units at an average density of 450.6 per square mile (173.8/km2). The racial makeup of the town was 93.68% White, 4.41% African American, 0.14% Native American, 0.45% Asian, 0.02% Pacific Islander, 0.37% from other races, and 0.93% from two or more races. Hispanic or Latino of any race were 0.60% of the population.

There were 1,995 households, out of which 29.6% had children under the age of 18 living with them, 48.7% were married couples living together, 15.3% had a female householder with no husband present, and 33.2% were non-families. 30.8% of all households were made up of individuals, and 13.8% had someone living alone who was 65 years of age or older. The average household size was 2.34 and the average family size was 2.92.

In the town, the population was spread out, with 23.2% under the age of 18, 9.0% from 18 to 24, 24.9% from 25 to 44, 25.1% from 45 to 64, and 17.9% who were 65 years of age or older. The median age was 40 years. For every 100 females, there were 86.9 males. For every 100 females age 18 and over, there were 80.5 males.

The median income for a household in the town was $21,584, and the median income for a family was $34,306. Males had a median income of $26,707 versus $21,915 for females. The per capita income for the town was $13,284. About 22.4% of families and 25.8% of the population were below the poverty line, including 34.5% of those under age 18 and 15.1% of those age 65 or over.

Film

Adriana Trigiani, who wrote the script for the movie Big Stone Gap, lobbied to have the 2014 film shot on location. The former gas station that was the setting for Carmine's restaurant in the movie still contains the soda fountain, tables and nostalgic wall posters used during filming. Next to it is the vacant Mutual's Pharmacy, where Ave Marie Mulligan, the main character in the movie, worked.

2008 tornado
An EF-1 tornado touched down March 4, 2008, on Highway 58, running through downtown.  The tornado caused a 300 yard wide, one mile long path of damage. It destroyed six homes, caused major damage to 15 homes, and minor damage to 25 others. The tornado hit an area of the town named Poplar Hill.

References

Southwest Virginia
Towns in Virginia
Towns in Wise County, Virginia
Mining communities in Virginia